Face of Canada is an art exhibition displaying paintings of notable Canadians. It was showcased on July 1, 2011, at Canada Place in Vancouver, displaying over 100 oil portraits of notable individuals, both past and present, that helped shape the nation.

Artist
The concept was derived by Canadian artist, William Lameire. Born in Vancouver, September 2, 1966, Lameire traveled to 49 countries studying art. Painting impressionist landscapes professionally, in an array of mediums over the past 10 years, Lameire turned his interest to portraiture work in oil. After seeing Team Canada win the men's hockey in the 2010 Olympic Games and feeling a sense of national pride, he started the 'Great Canadians,' a small series which eventually led to the Face of Canada. After much research, Meire realized the great number of notable Canadians who have shaped and changed the nation, and affected many lives. On July 1, 2011, crowds came to see the one-day solo exhibition of over 100 oil portraits at Canada Place, which has now become part of Canada's national heritage.

Subjects
The exhibition includes numerous portraits, including:

Scientists
Sir Frederick Banting, one of the main discoverers of insulin
David Suzuki, scientist and humanitarian

Athletes
Terry Fox, amputee who attempted to run cross-country, and raised $500 million for cancer research
Bobby Orr, hockey player
Wayne Gretzky, hockey player
Donovan Bailey, sprinter
Nancy Greene, Olympic skier

Media
Jack Kerouac, leader of the Beat movement
Neil Young, musician
Geddy Lee, musician
Celine Dion, vocalist
Sarah McLachlan, vocalist
Shania Twain, vocalist
Peter Jennings, television news anchor
Morley Safer, television news anchor
John Candy, actor
Jim Carrey, actor
Rachel McAdams, actor
Donald Sutherland, actor
Kiefer Sutherland, actor
Keanu Reeves, actor
Michael J. Fox, actor
Matthew Perry, actor
Raymond Burr, actor
Lorne Greene, actor
Jack L. Warner, founder of Warner Brothers

References

External links
  Face of Canada Exhibition

Art exhibitions in Canada
Canadian contemporary art